The MGR Race Course Stadium (also known as MGR Stadium) is a multi-purpose stadium in Madurai, India. It hosts several sporting events, including both, national and international kabaddi championships. It has a seating capacity of 10,000 and features a 400m synthetic athletic track.

History 
It was established by the Sports Development Authority of Tamil Nadu in 1970. It is one of the main sport destination in Madurai that is used by about 3000 people per day. In 2004,  was sanctioned by the state government for improving the infrastructure at the stadium. It was renovated once again in 2012.

It hosted the paralympic sports meeting, 1st South Zone Tamil Nadu Paralympic Swimming Championship in 2014. A proposal for constructing gallery around its hockey ground and for a shooting range were sent to government in 2014.

Facilities 
The stadium primarily used for hosting athletic events. Facilities at stadium include a 400m synthetic track for athletic events, four badminton courts, basketball courts, a cricket field, a football field, tennis courts, table tennis courts, volleyball court and a  swimming pool. It is also used to host other events such as kabaddi, powerlifting, and shooting in state and national levels. The stadium also has a male hostel which houses 140 inmates practising athletics, badminton, basketball, hockey, volleyball and football.

References

Buildings and structures in Madurai
Sports venues in Tamil Nadu
Athletics (track and field) venues in India
Swimming venues in India
Memorials to M G Ramachandran
Sport in Madurai
1970 establishments in Tamil Nadu
Sports venues completed in 1970
20th-century architecture in India